Mahmut Atalay (30 March 1934 – 4 December 2004) was a Turkish freestyle wrestler and coach of Circassian origin. He competed at the 1964 and 1968 Olympics and won a gold medal in 1968, placing fourth in 1964.

Wrestling career

He was born 1934 in Çorak, a village of Çorum Province in northern Turkey. He began wrestling in the traditional Turkish karakucak style before changing to freestyle wrestling. It was not until the age of 18 that he began Olympic wrestling in 1952. It took him a relatively long time to grow into the Turkish top class of freestyle wrestlers. It was not until the late 1950s, at the age of 25, that he was selected for the Turkish national wrestling team. He was admitted to the national team after winning the national title in 1959, and received training by the renowned wrestlers such as Yaşar Doğu, Celal Atik and Nasuh Akar and Halit Balamir. 

After the 1960 Olympic champion İsmail Ogan, who wrestled in Mahmut's weight class, ended his active career, the way was clear for him to compete in the international championships. From 1961, he competed for Turkey in many championships until 1968. However, it took until 1965 before he could win an international medal. Since Turkish wrestlers are among the strongest in the world in the free style along with the Soviet athletes and the U.S., it is surprising that Mahmut Atalay was given so many chances by the Turkish wrestling federation. In the end, he justified this trust when he became world champion in 1966 and Olympic champion in 1968. He achieved remarkable victories over the world class wrestlers Abdollah Movahed, Iran, Guliko Sagaradze and Sarbeg Beriashvili, both USSR and Enju Valchev Dimov, Bulgaria.

He became national champion 15 times, and besides his Olympic gold won several medals at other international competitions. In 1968, he was honored by the International Wrestling Federation  with the award "Most Technical Wrestler of the World". He retired from competitions in 1968 and then worked as a national wrestling coach for 16 years.

Atalay died on 4 December 2004 in Ankara following a heart attack.

References

External links
 

1934 births
2004 deaths
People from Çorum
Turkish people of Dagestani descent
Wrestlers at the 1964 Summer Olympics
Wrestlers at the 1968 Summer Olympics
Turkish male sport wrestlers
Olympic gold medalists for Turkey
Olympic medalists in wrestling
Medalists at the 1968 Summer Olympics
Medalists at the 1964 Summer Olympics
Mediterranean Games gold medalists for Turkey
Competitors at the 1959 Mediterranean Games
Competitors at the 1963 Mediterranean Games
Mediterranean Games medalists in wrestling
European Wrestling Championships medalists
World Wrestling Championships medalists
Turkish people of Circassian descent